The 1972 Milwaukee Panthers football team represented the University of Wisconsin–Milwaukee as an independent during the 1972 NCAA College Division football season. Led by Jerry Fishbain in his second and final season as head coach, Milwaukee compiled a record of 6–4. The Panthers offense scored 150 points while the defense allowed 103 points.

Schedule

References

Milwaukee
Milwaukee Panthers football seasons
Milwaukee Panthers football